One for All is a 2020 Spanish drama film directed by  which stars David Verdaguer alongside Patricia López Arnaiz, Ana Labordeta, and Clara Segura.

Plot 
The plot follows Aleix, a Catalan interim school teacher doing a substitution in an Aragonese village. He has to deal with the bullying exercised by his new class on one of the students (Carlos) who was sick upon Aleix's arrival and nobody wants him back.

Cast

Production 
The screenplay was penned by Valentina Viso and Coral Cruz. The film is an Inicia Films, Fasten Films, A Contracorriente Films, Bolo Audiovisual, Uno para todos AIE and Amalur AIE production. It had participation of TVE, TVC, Movistar+, Rakuten Cinema, and Aragón TV. Shooting began on 1 July 2019. Shooting locations included Arenys de Munt (Catalonia) and Caspe (Aragon).

Release 
The film had its world premiere at the Miami Film Festival in March 2020 rather than the intended Málaga Film Festival premiere, owing to the cancellation (eventually postponement) of the latter in the wake of the COVID-19 pandemic. It also screened as the opening film in the 4th . Distributed by A Contracorriente Films, it was theatrically released in Spain on 18 September 2020.

Reception 
Andrea G. Bermejo of Cinemanía rated the film 4 out 5 stars, deeming it to be a "magnificent film" for several reasons, including "a great script that vindicates the power of education"

Alberto Bermejo of El Mundo also scored 4 out of 5 stars praising "the originality of the writing and the sense of authenticity given off by the images and the behavior of the protagonists".<ref>{{Cite web|url=https://www.elmundo.es/metropoli/cine/2020/09/18/5f6078fffc6c83f7168b4574.html|website=Metrópoli|via=El Mundo|title=Uno para todos: Espejo de diversidad|first=Alberto|last=Bermejo}}</ref>

Jordi Batlle Caminal of Fotogramas'' rated it 3 out of 5 stars, highlighting Verdaguer's "credible and close" performance while citing the accumulation of clichés from the educational film genre as a negative point.

Accolades 

|-
| rowspan = "6" align = "center" | 2021
| rowspan = "2" | 26th Forqué Awards || Best Actor || David Verdaguer ||  || rowspan = "2" | 
|-
| colspan = "2" | Cinema and Education in Values ||  
|-
| 8th Feroz Awards || Best Actor || David Verdaguer ||  || align = "center" | 
|-
| 35th Goya Awards || Best Actor || David Verdaguer ||  || align = "center" | 
|-
| rowspan = "2" | 13th Gaudí Awards || Best Actor || David Verdaguer ||  || rowspan = "2" | 
|-
| Best Cinematography || Bet Rourich || 
|}

See also 
 List of Spanish films of 2020

References 

Films about teacher–student relationships
Films about school bullying
Spanish drama films
2020 drama films
2020s Spanish-language films
Films shot in the province of Barcelona
Films shot in the province of Zaragoza
Films set in Aragon
2020s Spanish films